Dissotis is a genus of plants in the family Melastomataceae. There are about 49 accepted species (by Kew), which are distributed across most of Africa, except Northern Africa.

Etymology
The generic name is based on the Greek word , which means 'twofold'. This refers to the two types of anthers that is a characteristic of this genus.

Species
As accepted by Kew;

Dissotis alata 
Dissotis anchietae 
Dissotis aquatica 
Dissotis benguellensis 
Dissotis buraeavii 
Dissotis carrissoi 
Dissotis castroi 
Dissotis chevalieri 
Dissotis congolensis 
Dissotis cordifolia 
Dissotis crenulata 
Dissotis cryptantha 
Dissotis densiflora 
Dissotis denticulata 
Dissotis echinata 
Dissotis elegans 
Dissotis falcipila 
Dissotis formosa 
Dissotis gilgiana 
Dissotis glaberrima 
Dissotis gossweileri 
Dissotis grandiflora 
Dissotis homblei 
Dissotis idanreensis 
Dissotis lebrunii 
Dissotis leonensis 
Dissotis longicaudata 
Dissotis longisepala 
Dissotis longisetosa 
Dissotis louisii 
Dissotis pauciflora 
Dissotis peregrina 
Dissotis perkinsiae 
Dissotis princeps 
Dissotis pterocaulos 
Dissotis pulchra 
Dissotis rhinanthifolia 
Dissotis riparia 
Dissotis ruandensis 
Dissotis scabra 
Dissotis sessili-cordata 
Dissotis simonis-jamesii 
Dissotis sizenandoi 
Dissotis speciosa 
Dissotis splendens 
Dissotis swynnertonii 
Dissotis thollonii 
Dissotis trothae 
Dissotis welwitschii

References

External links

Melastomataceae genera
Melastomataceae